The David Campbell was a fireboat built in 1912 for Oregon's Portland Fire and Rescue.
She was a steam-powered vessel, built in a Michigan shipyard, disassembled, shipped in pieces, and reassembled in Portland.  Her engines could develop 

The David Campbell had two identical sister ships, the Mike Laudenklos and the Karl Gunster.

Following her retirement, in 1928, she was converted to a schooner, and remains afloat, in Alaska.

She was replaced by another vessel, or the same name, that remained in use at least until 2012.

References

Fireboats of Oregon